The mua was one of three chiefly roles with direct influence across the island of Rotuma, the other two being the Fakpure and the Sau. The mua was referred as the head priest of the island who presided over rituals and prayers.

List of title holders

Sources
World Statesmen
Rotuma.net

Rotuma